Robert Lundy (fl. 1689) (died 1717) was a Scottish army officer best known for serving as Governor of Londonderry during the early stages of the Siege of Derry.

Early career
Lundy was born in Dumbarton and raised in the Church of Scotland. He pursued a military career, serving in the Earl of Dumbarton's regiment in the French Army of Louis XIV. He had risen to rank of captain when the regiment returned to Scotland in 1678 where it was renamed the Royal Scots. Lundy continued to serve with the regiment when it was sent out to reinforce the Tangier Garrison. In October 1680 he was wounded during a battle with the local Moroccan forces during the Great Siege of Tangier.

He married an Irish wife, Martha Davies, whose father, Rowland Davies, became later the Dean of Cork, and through her family connections was able to secure promotion to lieutenant colonel in the Royal Irish Army. In 1688 he was at Dublin in the regiment of Viscount Mountjoy.

Siege of Derry

However, in 1685 Charles II died and James II succeeded. In 1687 he replaced Ormonde with Richard Talbot and introduced a policy of replacing Protestant officers with Catholic ones in the Irish Army. Mountjoy was one of few Protestants remaining in the army and he could protect his Protestant soldiers and officers, such as Lundy.

The Apprentice Boys of Derry shut the gates of the city against "a regiment of twelve hundred Papists, commanded by a Papist, Alexander Macdonnell, Earl of Antrim", who hastily withdrew his small force. Later, the Viceroy solicited intervention by Mountjoy and finally dispatched a strong but poorly disciplined Irish force commanded by Sir Richard Hamilton to march north against the Protestants.

A stratagem prepared by Mountjoy and Lundy to assume control of Derry succeeded in embedding a small garrison of predominantly Protestant troops under the command first of Mountjoy then of Lundy, who assumed the title of governor.

On 14 April English ships appeared in the Foyle with reinforcements for Lundy under Colonel John Cunningham and Solomon Richards. Lundy dissuaded Cunningham from landing his regiments, representing that a defence of Derry was hopeless; and that he himself intended to withdraw secretly from the city. At the same time he sent to the enemy's headquarters a promise to surrender the city at the first summons. As soon as this became known to the citizens, Lundy's life was in danger, and he was vehemently accused of treachery. When the enemy appeared before the walls, Lundy gave orders that there should be no firing. But all authority had passed out of his hands.

The people flew to arms under the direction of Major Henry Baker and Captain Adam Murray, who organised the famous defence in conjunction with the Rev. George Walker. Lundy, to avoid popular vengeance, hid himself until nightfall when, by the connivance of Walker and Murray, he made his escape in disguise.

Later life
He was apprehended in western Scotland, imprisoned at Dumbarton Castle, and then sent to the Tower of London. He was excluded from the Act of Indemnity in 1690. An effort was made to send him for trial at Derry, but this was argued against because it was evident that Lundy still retained the support of influential people there. As Reverend George Walker described this, "he had a faction for him" in the town. After an enquiry in London he was "cleared of charges of treason" and returned to military service.

From 1704 to 1712 he was "Adjudent-General of the King of Portugal's forces in the Queen of England's pay" during the War of Spanish Succession where he defended Gibraltar against the French. In 1707 he was captured by the French, but was exchanged a year later.

Legacy

Lundy is reviled in Ulster loyalism as a traitor to this day, and is burned in effigy during the celebrations to mark the anniversary of the shutting of the gates of Derry in 1688. Much like Judas, his name has become a byword for "traitor" among unionists and loyalists. Ian Paisley regularly denounced people, including Margaret Thatcher, Terence O'Neill and David Trimble, as "Lundies".

See also
 Williamite war in Ireland
 Jacobitism

Notes and references

Bibliography 
 Childs, John. The Williamite War in Ireland, 1688-1691. Continuum, 2007.
  This work in turn cites:
 Lord Macaulay, History of England, vol. in. (Albany edition of complete works, London, 1898)
 Rev. George Walker, A True Account of the Siege of Londonderry (London, 1689)
 J. Mackenzie, Narrative of the Siege of Londonderry (London, 1690)
 John Hempton, The Siege and History of Londonderry (Londonderry, 1861)
 Rev. John Graham, A History of the Siege of Derry and Defence of Enniskillen, 1688-9 (Dublin, 1829)

History of Derry (city)
1688 in Ireland
1717 deaths
Scottish soldiers
Williamite military personnel of the Williamite War in Ireland
Prisoners in the Tower of London
Year of birth unknown
Soldiers of the Tangier Garrison
People from Dumbarton